Thelma Boardman (born Thelma Joyce Hubbard, October 31, 1909 – April 21, 1978) was an American voice actress and writer best known for her work with the Walt Disney Studios, particularly as the voice actress for Minnie Mouse from 1937–1938 and 1941–1942.

Biography 
Thelma Joyce Hubbard was born in the Panama Canal Zone on October 31, 1909, to Edward Lucius and Rebecca Cecelia (née Delevante) Hubbard. She married Russell Erwin Diehl on July 7, 1929, before marrying True Boardman, with whom she had two children. She began voicing Minnie Mouse as part of the radio show The Mickey Mouse Theater of the Air in 1937 and made her film debut in 1938 as Donald's Angel in Donald's Better Self. She died on April 21, 1978, in Los Angeles, California.

In 1932, she was campaign manager for her father when he sought nomination to be a Democratic candidate for Congress from California.

Selected filmography

As an actress
Donald's Better Self (1938)
Mother Goose Goes Hollywood (1938)
Snow White and the Seven Dwarfs (Dubbing to Spanish, 1938) as Snow White
The Little Whirlwind (1941)
The Nifty Nineties (1941)
The Art of Skiing (1941)
Donald's Decision (1942)
Mickey's Birthday Party (1942)
Bambi (1942)

As a writer
Ethel Barrymore Theater (1956)
Gunsmoke (1971)

References

1909 births
1978 deaths
American radio actresses
Disney  people